The Colițca is a right tributary of the river Crasna in Romania. It discharges into the Vârșolț Reservoir, which is drained by the Crasna.

References

Rivers of Romania
Rivers of Sălaj County